Qajar Iran, also referred to as Qajar Persia, the Qajar Empire, Sublime State of Persia, officially the Sublime State of Iran and also known as the Guarded Domains of Iran, was an Iranian state ruled by the Qajar dynasty, which was of Turkic origin, specifically from the Qajar tribe, from 1789 to 1925. The Qajar family took full control of Iran in 1794, deposing Lotf 'Ali Khan, the last Shah of the Zand dynasty, and re-asserted Iranian sovereignty over large parts of the Caucasus. In 1796, Agha Mohammad Khan Qajar seized Mashhad with ease, putting an end to the Afsharid dynasty. He was formally crowned as Shah after his punitive campaign against Iran's Georgian subjects. 

In the Caucasus, the Qajar dynasty permanently lost much territory to the Russian Empire over the course of the 19th century, comprising modern-day eastern Georgia, Dagestan, Azerbaijan, and Armenia. Despite its territorial losses, Qajar Iran reinvented the Iranian notion of kingship and maintained relative political independence, but faced major challenges to its sovereignty, predominantly from the Russian and British empires. Foreign advisers became powerbrokers in the court and military. They eventually partitioned Qajar Iran in the 1907 Anglo-Russian Convention, carving out Russian and British influence zones and a neutral zone. 

In the early 20th century, the Persian Constitutional Revolution created an elected parliament or Majilis, and sought the establishment of a constitutional monarchy, deposing Mohammad Ali Shah Qajar for Ahmad Shah Qajar, but many of the constitutional reforms were reversed by an intervention led by the Russian Empire. Qajar Iran's territorial integrity was further weakened during the Persian campaign of World War I and the invasion by the Ottoman Empire. Four years after the 1921 Persian coup d'état, Reza Shah took power in 1925 and formed the Imperial State of Persia.

History

Origins
The Qajar rulers were members of the Karagöz or "Black-Eye" sect of the Qajars, who themselves were members of the Qajars (tribe) or "Black Hats" lineage of the Oghuz Turks. Qajars first settled during the Mongol period in the vicinity of Armenia and were among the seven Qizilbash tribes that supported the Safavids. The Safavids "left Arran (present-day Republic of Azerbaijan) to local Turkic khans", and, "in 1554 Ganja was governed by Shahverdi Soltan Ziyadoglu Qajar, whose family came to govern Karabakh in southern Arran".

Qajars filled a number of diplomatic missions and governorships in the 16–17th centuries for the Safavids. The Qajars were resettled by Shah Abbas I throughout Iran. The great number of them also settled in Astarabad (present-day Gorgan, Iran) near the south-eastern corner of the Caspian Sea, and it would be this branch of Qajars that would rise to power. The immediate ancestor of the Qajar dynasty, Shah Qoli Khan of the Quvanlu of Ganja (also spelled Ghovanloo or Ghovanlou), married into the Quvanlu Qajars of Astarabad. His son, Fath Ali Khan (born c. 1685–1693) was a renowned military commander during the rule of the Safavid shahs Sultan Husayn and Tahmasp II. He was killed on the orders of Shah Nader Shah in 1726. Fath Ali Khan's son Mohammad Hasan Khan Qajar (1722–1758) was the father of Mohammad Khan Qajar and Hossein Qoli Khan (Jahansouz Shah), father of "Baba Khan," the future Fath-Ali Shah Qajar. Mohammad Hasan Khan was killed on the orders of Karim Khan of the Zand dynasty.

Within 126 years between the demise of the Safavid state and the rise of Naser al-Din Shah Qajar, the Qajars had evolved from a shepherd-warrior tribe with strongholds in northern Persia into a Persian dynasty with all the trappings of a Perso-Islamic monarchy.

Rise to power

"Like virtually every dynasty that ruled Persia since the 11th century, the Qajars came to power with the backing of Turkic tribal forces, while using educated Persians in their bureaucracy". Among these Turkic tribes, however, Turkmens of Iran played the most prominent role in bringing Qajars to power. In 1779 following the death of Karim Khan of the Zand dynasty, Agha Mohammad Khan Qajar, the leader of the Qajars, set out to reunify Iran. Agha Mohammad Khan was known as one of the cruelest kings, even by the standards of 18th-century Iran. In his quest for power, he razed cities, massacred entire populations, and blinded some 20,000 men in the city of Kerman because the local populace had chosen to defend the city against his siege.

The Qajar armies at that time were mostly composed of Turkoman warriors and Georgian slaves. By 1794, Agha Mohammad Khan had eliminated all his rivals, including Lotf Ali Khan, the last of the Zand dynasty. He reestablished Persian control over the territories in the entire Caucasus. Agha Mohammad established his capital at Tehran, a town near the ruins of the ancient city of Rayy. In 1796, he was formally crowned as shah. In 1797, Agha Mohammad Khan was assassinated in Shusha, the capital of Karabakh Khanate, and was succeeded by his nephew, Fath-Ali Shah Qajar.

Reconquest of Georgia and the rest of the Caucasus

In 1744, Nader Shah had granted the kingship of the Kartli and Kakheti to Teimuraz II and his son Erekle II (Heraclius II) respectively, as a reward for their loyalty. When Nader Shah died in 1747, they capitalized on the chaos that had erupted in mainland Iran, and declared de facto independence. After Teimuraz II died in 1762, Erekle II assumed control over Kartli, and united the two kingdoms in a personal union as the Kingdom of Kartli-Kakheti, becoming the first Georgian ruler to preside over a politically unified eastern Georgia in three centuries. At about the same time, Karim Khan Zand had ascended the Iranian throne; Erekle II quickly tendered his de jure submission to the new Iranian ruler, however, de facto, he remained autonomous. In 1783, Erekle II placed his kingdom under the protection of the Russian Empire in the Treaty of Georgievsk. In the last few decades of the 18th century, Georgia had become a more important element in Russo-Iranian relations than some provinces in northern mainland Persia, such as Mazandaran or even Gilan. Unlike Peter the Great, Catherine the Great, the then-ruling monarch of Russia, viewed Georgia as a pivot for her Caucasian policy, as Russia's new aspirations were to use it as a base of operations against both Iran and the Ottoman Empire, both immediate bordering geopolitical rivals of Russia. On top of that, having another port on the Georgian coast of the Black Sea would be ideal. A limited Russian contingent of two infantry battalions with four artillery pieces arrived in Tbilisi in 1784, but was withdrawn in 1787, despite the frantic protests of the Georgians, as a new war against Ottoman Turkey had started on a different front.

The consequences of these events came a few years later when a strong new Iranian dynasty under the Qajars emerged victorious in the protracted power struggle in Persia. Their head, Agha Mohammad Khan, as his first objective, resolved to bring the Caucasus again fully under the Persian orbit. For Agha Mohammad Khan, the resubjugation and reintegration of Georgia into the Iranian Empire was part of the same process that had brought Shiraz, Isfahan, and Tabriz under his rule. He viewed, like the Safavids and Nader Shah before him, the territories no different from the territories in mainland Iran. Georgia was a province of Iran the same way Khorasan was. As the Cambridge History of Iran states, its permanent secession was inconceivable and had to be resisted in the same way as one would resist an attempt at the separation of Fars or Gilan. It was therefore natural for Agha Mohammad Khan to perform whatever necessary means in the Caucasus in order to subdue and reincorporate the recently lost regions following Nader Shah's death and the demise of the Zands, including putting down what in Iranian eyes was seen as treason on the part of the vali of Georgia.

Finding an interval of peace amid their own quarrels and with northern, western, and central Persia secure, the Persians demanded Erekle II to renounce the treaty with Russia and to reaccept Persian suzerainty, in return for peace and the security of his kingdom. The Ottomans, Iran's neighboring rival, recognized the latter's rights over Kartli and Kakheti for the first time in four centuries. Erekle appealed then to his theoretical protector, Empress Catherine II of Russia, asking for at least 3,000 Russian troops, but he was ignored, leaving Georgia to fend off the Persian threat alone. Nevertheless, Erekle II still rejected Agha Mohammad Khan's ultimatum.

In August 1795, Agha Mohammad Khan crossed the Aras River, and after a turn of events by which he gathered more support from his subordinate khans of Erivan and Ganja, and having re-secured the territories up to including parts of Dagestan in the north and up to the westernmost border of modern-day Armenia in the west, he sent Erekle the last ultimatum, which he also declined, but, sent couriers to St.Petersburg. Gudovich, who sat in Georgievsk at the time, instructed Erekle to avoid "expense and fuss", while Erekle, together with Solomon II and some Imeretians headed southwards of Tbilisi to fend off the Iranians.

With half of the troop's Agha Mohammad Khan crossed the Aras river with, he now marched directly upon Tbilisi, where it commenced into a huge battle between the Iranian and Georgian armies. Erekle had managed to mobilize some 5,000 troops, including some 2,000 from neighboring Imereti under its King Solomon II. The Georgians, hopelessly outnumbered, were eventually defeated despite stiff resistance. In a few hours, the Iranian king Agha Mohammad Khan was in full control of the Georgian capital. The Persian army marched back laden with spoil and carrying off many thousands of captives.

By this, after the conquest of Tbilisi and being in effective control of eastern Georgia, Agha Mohammad was formally crowned Shah in 1796 in the Mughan plain. As the Cambridge History of Iran notes; "Russia's client, Georgia, had been punished, and Russia's prestige, damaged." Erekle II returned to Tbilisi to rebuild the city, but the destruction of his capital was a death blow to his hopes and projects. Upon learning of the fall of Tbilisi General Gudovich put the blame on the Georgians themselves. To restore Russian prestige, Catherine II declared war on Persia, upon the proposal of Gudovich, and sent an army under Valerian Zubov to the Qajar possessions on April of that year, but the new Tsar Paul I, who succeeded Catherine in November, shortly recalled it.

Agha Mohammad Shah was later assassinated while preparing a second expedition against Georgia in 1797 in Shusha. Reassessment of Iranian hegemony over Georgia did not last long; in 1799 the Russians marched into Tbilisi, two years after Agha Mohammad Khan's death. The next two years were a time of muddle and confusion, and the weakened and devastated Georgian kingdom, with its capital half in ruins, was easily absorbed by Russia in 1801. As Iran could not permit or allow the cession of Transcaucasia and Dagestan, which had formed part of the concept of Iran for centuries, it would also directly lead up to the wars of even several years later, namely the Russo-Persian War (1804–1813) and Russo-Persian War (1826–1828), which would eventually prove for the irrevocable forced cession of aforementioned regions to Imperial Russia per the treaties of Gulistan (1813) and Turkmenchay (1828), as the ancient ties could only be severed by a superior force from outside. It was therefore also inevitable that Agha Mohammad Khan's successor, Fath Ali Shah (under whom Iran would lead the two above-mentioned wars) would follow the same policy of restoring Iranian central authority north of the Aras and Kura rivers.

Wars with Russia and irrevocable loss of territories

On 12 September 1801, four years after Agha Mohammad Khan Qajar's death, the Russians capitalized on the moment, and annexed Kartli-Kakheti (eastern Georgia). In 1804, the Russians invaded and sacked the Iranian town of Ganja, massacring and expelling thousands of its inhabitants, thereby beginning the Russo-Persian War of 1804–1813. Under Fath Ali Shah (r. 1797–1834), the Qajars set out to fight against the invading Russian Empire, who were keen to take the Iranian territories in the region. This period marked the first major economic and military encroachments on Iranian interests during the colonial era. The Qajar army suffered a major military defeat in the war, and under the terms of the Treaty of Gulistan in 1813, Iran was forced to cede most of its Caucasian territories comprising modern-day Georgia, Dagestan, and most of Azerbaijan.

About a decade later, in violation of the Gulistan Treaty, the Russians invaded Iran's Erivan Khanate. This sparked the final bout of hostilities between the two; the Russo-Persian War of 1826–1828. It ended even more disastrously for Qajar Iran with temporary occupation of Tabriz and the signing of the Treaty of Turkmenchay in 1828, acknowledging Russian sovereignty over the entire South Caucasus and Dagestan, as well as therefore the ceding of what is nowadays Armenia and the remaining part of Republic of Azerbaijan; the new border between neighboring Russia and Iran were set at the Aras River. Iran had by these two treaties, in the course of the 19th century, irrevocably lost the territories which had formed part of the concept of Iran for centuries. The area to the North of the river Aras, among which the territory of the contemporary Republic of Azerbaijan, eastern Georgia, Dagestan, and Armenia was Iranian territory until they were occupied by Russia in the course of the 19th century.

As a further direct result and consequence of the Gulistan and Turkmenchay treaties of 1813 and 1828 respectively, the formerly Iranian territories became part of Russia for around the next 180 years, except Dagestan, which has remained a Russian possession ever since. Out of the greater part of the territory, six separate nations would be formed through the dissolution of the Soviet Union in 1991, namely Georgia, Azerbaijan, Armenia, and three generally unrecognized republics Abkhazia, Artsakh and South Ossetia claimed by Georgia. Lastly and equally important, as a result of Russia's imposing of the two treaties, It also decisively parted the Azerbaijanis and Talysh ever since between two nations.

With the conclusion of the Akhal Treaty on 21 September 1881, Iran ceased any claim to all parts of Turkestan and Transoxiana, setting the Atrek River as the new boundary with Imperial Russia. Hence Merv, Sarakhs, Eshgh Abad, and the surrounding areas were transferred to Russian control under the command of General Alexander Komarov in 1884.

Migration of Caucasian Muslims

Following the official losing of the aforementioned vast territories in the Caucasus, major demographic shifts were bound to take place. Solidly Persian-speaking territories of Iran were lost, with all its inhabitants in it. Following the 1804–1814 War, but also per the 1826–1828 war which ceded the last territories, large migrations, so-called Caucasian Muhajirs, set off to migrate to mainland Iran. Some of these groups included the Ayrums, Qarapapaqs, Circassians, Shia Lezgins, and other Transcaucasian Muslims.

Through the Battle of Ganja of 1804 during the Russo-Persian War (1804–1813), many thousands of Ayrums and Qarapapaqs were settled in Tabriz. During the remaining part of the 1804–1813 war, as well as through the 1826–1828 war, the absolute bulk of the Ayrums and Qarapapaqs that were still remaining in newly conquered Russian territories were settled in and migrated to Solduz (in modern-day Iran's West Azerbaijan province). As the Cambridge History of Iran states; "The steady encroachment of Russian troops along the frontier in the Caucasus, General Yermolov's brutal punitive expeditions and misgovernment, drove large numbers of Muslims, and even some Georgian Christians, into exile in Iran."

In 1864 until the early 20th century, another mass expulsion took place of Caucasian Muslims as a result of the Russian victory in the Caucasian War. Others simply voluntarily refused to live under Christian Russian rule, and thus disembarked for Turkey or Iran. These migrations once again, towards Iran, included masses of Caucasian Azerbaijanis, other Transcaucasian Muslims, as well as many North Caucasian Muslims, such as Circassians, Shia Lezgins and Laks.
Many of these migrants would prove to play a pivotal role in further Iranian history, as they formed most of the ranks of the Persian Cossack Brigade, which was also to be established in the late 19th century. The initial ranks of the brigade would be entirely composed of Circassians and other Caucasian Muhajirs. This brigade would prove decisive in the following decades to come in Qajar history.

Furthermore, the 1828 Treaty of Turkmenchay included the official rights for the Russian Empire to encourage settling of Armenians from Iran in the newly conquered Russian territories. Until the mid-fourteenth century, Armenians had constituted a majority in Eastern Armenia. 
At the close of the fourteenth century, after Timur's campaigns, Islam had become the dominant faith, and Armenians became a minority in Eastern Armenia. After centuries of constant warfare on the Armenian Plateau, many Armenians chose to emigrate and settle elsewhere. Following Shah Abbas I's massive relocation of Armenians and Muslims in 1604–05, their numbers dwindled even further.

At the time of the Russian invasion of Iran, some 80% of the population of Erivan Khanate in Iranian Armenia were Muslims (Persians, Turkics, and Kurds) whereas Christian Armenians constituted a minority of about 20%. As a result of the Treaty of Gulistan (1813) and the Treaty of Turkmenchay (1828), Iran was forced to cede Iranian Armenia (which also constituted the present-day Armenia), to the Russians. After the Russian administration took hold of Iranian Armenia, the ethnic make-up shifted, and thus for the first time in more than four centuries, ethnic Armenians started to form a majority once again in one part of historic Armenia.

Fath Ali Shah's reign saw increased diplomatic contacts with the West and the beginning of intense European diplomatic rivalries over Iran. His grandson Mohammad Shah, who fell under the Russian influence and made two unsuccessful attempts to capture Herat, succeeded him in 1834. When Mohammad Shah died in 1848 the succession passed to his son Nasser-e-Din, who proved to be the ablest and most successful of the Qajar sovereigns.  He founded the first modern hospital in Iran.

Development and decline

During Nasser-e-Din Shah's reign, Western science, technology, and educational methods were introduced into Persia and the country's modernization was begun. Nasser ed-Din Shah tried to exploit the mutual distrust between Great Britain and Russia to preserve Persia's independence, but foreign interference and territorial encroachment increased under his rule. He was not able to prevent Britain and Russia from encroaching into regions of traditional Persian influence. In 1856, during the Anglo-Persian War, Britain prevented Persia from reasserting control over Herat. The city had been part of Persia in Safavid times, but Herat had been under the non-Persian rule since the mid–18th century. Britain also extended its control to other areas of the Persian Gulf during the 19th century. Meanwhile, by 1881, Russia had completed its conquest of present-day Turkmenistan and Uzbekistan, bringing Russia's frontier to Persia's northeastern borders and severing historic Persian ties to the cities of Bukhara, Merv and Samarqand. Several trade concessions by the Persian government put economic affairs largely under British control. By the late 19th century, many Persians believed that their rulers were beholden to foreign interests.

Mirza Taghi Khan Amir Kabir, was the young prince Nasser-e-Din's advisor and constable. With the death of Mohammad Shah in 1848, Mirza Taqi was largely responsible for ensuring the crown prince's succession to the throne. When Nasser ed-Din succeeded to the throne, Amir Nezam was awarded the position of the prime minister and the title of Amir Kabir, the Great Ruler.

At that time, Persia was nearly bankrupt. During the next two and a half years Amir Kabir initiated important reforms in virtually all sectors of society. Government expenditure was slashed, and a distinction was made between the private and public purses. The instruments of central administration were overhauled, and Amir Kabir assumed responsibility for all areas of the bureaucracy.  There were Bahai revolts and a revolt in Khurasan at the time but were crushed under Amir Kabir. Foreign interference in Persia's domestic affairs was curtailed, and foreign trade was encouraged. Public works such as the bazaar in Tehran were undertaken. Amir Kabir issued an edict banning ornate and excessively formal writing in government documents; the beginning of a modern Persian prose style dates from this time.

One of the greatest achievements of Amir Kabir was the building of Dar ol Fonoon in 1851, the first modern university in Persia and the Middle East. Dar-ol-Fonoon was established for training a new cadre of administrators and acquainting them with Western techniques. It marked the beginning of modern education in Persia. Amir Kabir ordered the school to be built on the edge of the city so it could be expanded as needed. He hired French and Russian instructors as well as Persians to teach subjects as different as Language, Medicine, Law, Geography, History, Economics, and Engineering, amongst numerous others. Unfortunately, Amir Kabir did not live long enough to see his greatest monument completed, but it still stands in Tehran as a sign of a great man's ideas for the future of his country.

These reforms antagonized various notables who had been excluded from the government. They regarded the Amir Kabir as a social upstart and a threat to their interests, and they formed a coalition against him, in which the queen mother was active. She convinced the young shah that Amir Kabir wanted to usurp the throne. In October 1851, the shah dismissed him and exiled him to Kashan, where he was murdered on the shah's orders. Through his marriage to Ezzat od-Doleh, Amir Kabir had been the brother-in-law of the shah.

The Qajar Iran would become a victim of the Great Game between Russia and Britain for influence over central Asia. As the Qajar state's sovereignty was challenged this took the form of military conquests, diplomatic intrigues, and the competition of trade goods between two foreign empires. Ever since the 1828 Treaty of Turkmanchay, Russia had received territorial domination in Iran. With the Romanovs shifting to a policy of 'informal support' for the weakened Qajar dynasty — continuing to place pressure with advances in the largely nomadic Turkestan, a crucial frontier territory of the Qajars — this Russian domination of Persia continued for nearly a century. The Persian monarchy became more of a symbolic concept in which Russian diplomats were themselves powerbrokers in Iran and the monarchy was dependent on British and Russian loans for funds. In 1879, the establishment of the Cossack Brigade by Russian officers gave the Russian Empire influence over the modernization of the Qajar army. This influence was especially pronounced because the Persian monarchy's legitimacy was predicated on an image of military prowess, first Turkic and then European-influenced. By the 1890s, Russian tutors, doctors and officers were prominent at the Shah's court, influencing policy personally. Russia and Britain had competing investments in the industrialisation of Iran including roads and telegraph lines, as a way to profit and extend their influence. However, until 1907 the Great Game rivalry was so pronounced that mutual British and Russian demands to the Shah to exclude the other, blocked all railroad construction in Iran at the end of the 19th century. In 1907 the British and Russian Empires partitioned Iran into spheres of influence with the Anglo-Russian Convention.

Constitutional Revolution

When Nasser al-Din Shah Qajar was assassinated by Mirza Reza Kermani in 1896, the crown passed to his son Mozaffar-e-din. Mozaffar-e-din Shah was a moderate, but relatively ineffective ruler. Royal extravagances coincided with an inadequate ability to secure state revenue which further exacerbated the financial woes of the Qajar. In response, the Shah procured two large loans from Russia (in part to fund personal trips to Europe). Public anger mounted as the Shah sold off concessions – such as road building monopolies, the authority to collect duties on imports, etc. – to European interests in return for generous payments to the Shah and his officials. Popular demand to curb arbitrary royal authority in favor of the rule of law increased as concern regarding growing foreign penetration and influence heightened.

The shah's failure to respond to protests by the religious establishment, the merchants, and other classes led the merchants and clerical leaders in January 1906 to take sanctuary from probable arrest in mosques in Tehran and outside the capital. When the shah reneged on a promise to permit the establishment of a "house of justice", or consultative assembly, 10,000 people, led by the merchants, took sanctuary in June in the compound of the British legation in Tehran. In August, the shah, through the issue of a decree promised a constitution. In October, an elected assembly convened and drew up a constitution that provided for strict limitations on royal power, an elected parliament, or Majles, with wide powers to represent the people and a government with a cabinet subject to confirmation by the Majles. The shah signed the constitution on 30 December 1906, but refusing to forfeit all of his power to the Majles, attached a caveat that made his signature on all laws required for their enactment. He died five days later. The Supplementary Fundamental Laws approved in 1907 provided, within limits, for freedom of press, speech, and association, and for the security of life and property. The hopes for the constitutional rule were not realized, however.

Mozaffar-e-din Shah's son Mohammad Ali Shah (reigned 1907–1909), who, through his mother, was also the grandson of Prime-Minister Amir Kabir (see before), with the aid of Russia, attempted to rescind the constitution and abolish parliamentary government. After several disputes with the members of the Majles, in June 1908 he used his Russian-officered Persian Cossack Brigade (almost solely composed of Caucasian Muhajirs), to bomb the Majlis building, arrest many of the deputies (December 1907), and close down the assembly (June 1908). Resistance to the shah, however, coalesced in Tabriz, Isfahan, Rasht, and elsewhere. In July 1909, constitutional forces marched from Rasht to Tehran led by Mohammad Vali Khan Sepahsalar Khalatbari Tonekaboni, deposed the Shah, and re-established the constitution. The ex-shah went into exile in Russia. Shah died in San Remo, Italy, in April 1925. Every future Shah of Iran would also die in exile.

On 16 July 1909, the Majles voted to place Mohammad Ali Shah's 11-year-old son, Ahmad Shah on the throne. Although the constitutional forces had triumphed, they faced serious difficulties. The upheavals of the Constitutional Revolution and civil war had undermined stability and trade. In addition, the ex-shah, with Russian support, attempted to regain his throne, landing troops in July 1910. Most serious of all, the hope that the Constitutional Revolution would inaugurate a new era of independence from the great powers ended when, under the Anglo-Russian Entente of 1907, Britain and Russia agreed to divide Persia into spheres of influence. The Russians were to enjoy exclusive right to pursue their interests in the northern sphere, the British in the south and east; both powers would be free to compete for economic and political advantage in a neutral sphere in the center. Matters came to a head when Morgan Shuster, a United States administrator hired as treasurer-general by the Persian government to reform its finances, sought to collect taxes from powerful officials who were Russian protégés and to send members of the treasury gendarmerie, a tax department police force, into the Russian zone. When in December 1911 the Majlis unanimously refused a Russian ultimatum demanding Shuster's dismissal, Russian troops, already in the country, moved to occupy the capital. To prevent this, on 20 December, Bakhtiari chiefs and their troops surrounded the Majles building, forced acceptance of the Russian ultimatum, and shut down the assembly, once again suspending the constitution.

British and Russian officials coordinated as the Russian army, still present in Persia, invaded the capital again and suspended the parliament. The Tsar ordered the troops in Tabriz "to act harshly and quickly", while purges were ordered, leading to many executions of prominent revolutionaries. The British Ambassador, George Head Barclay reported disapproval of this "reign of terror", though would soon pressure Persian ministers to officialize the Anglo-Russian partition of Iran. By June 1914, Russia established near-total control over its northern zone, while Britain had established influence over Baluch and Bakhtiari autonomous tribal leaders in the southeastern zone. Qajar Iran would become a battleground between Russian, Ottoman, and British forces in the Persian campaign of World War I.

World War I and related events

Though Qajar Iran had announced strict neutrality on the first day of November 1914 (which was reiterated by each successive government thereafter), the neighboring Ottoman Empire invaded it relatively shortly after, in the same year. At that time, large parts of Iran were under tight Russian influence and control, and since 1910 Russian forces were present inside the country, while many of its cities possessed Russian garrisons. Due to the latter reason, as Prof. Dr. Touraj Atabaki states, declaring neutrality was useless, especially as Iran had no force to implement this policy.

At the beginning of the war, the Ottomans invaded Iranian Azerbaijan. Numerous clashes would take place there between the Russians, who were further aided by the Assyrians under Agha Petros as well as Armenian volunteer units and battalions, and the Ottomans on the other side. However, with the advent of the Russian Revolution of 1917 and the subsequent withdrawal of most of the Russian troops, the Ottomans gained the upper hand in Iran, occupying significant portions of the country until the end of the war. Between 1914 and 1918, the Ottoman troops massacred many thousands of Iran's Assyrian and Armenian population, as part of the Assyrian and Armenian genocides, respectively.

The front in Iran would last up to the Armistice of Mudros in 1918.

Fall of the dynasty
Ahmad Shah Qajar was born 21 January 1898 in Tabriz, and succeeded to the throne at age 11. However, the occupation of Persia during World War I by Russian, British, and Ottoman troops was a blow from which Ahmad Shah never effectively recovered.

In February 1921, Reza Khan, commander of the Persian Cossack Brigade, staged a coup d'état, becoming the effective ruler of Iran. In 1923, Ahmad Shah went into exile in Europe. Reza Khan induced the Majles to depose Ahmad Shah in October 1925 and to exclude the Qajar dynasty permanently. Reza Khan was subsequently proclaimed monarch as Reza Shah Pahlavi, reigning from 1925 to 1941.

Ahmad Shah died on February 21, 1930, in Neuilly-sur-Seine, France.

Government and administration 

Iran was divided into five large provinces and a large number of smaller ones at the beginning of Fath Ali Shah's reign, about 20 provinces in 1847, 39 in 1886, but 18 in 1906. In 1868, most province governors were Qajar princes.

Military 

The Qajar military was one of the dynasty's largest conventional sources of legitimacy, albeit was increasingly influenced by foreign powers over the course of the dynasty.

Irregular forces, such as tribal cavalry, were a major element until the late nineteenth century, and irregular forces long remained a significant part of the Qajar army.

Russia established the Persian Cossack Brigade in 1879, a force which was led by Russian officers and served as a vehicle for Russian influence in Iran.

By the 1910s, the Qajar Iran was decentralised to the extent that foreign powers sought to bolster the central authority of the Qajars by providing military aid. It was viewed as a process of defensive modernisation; however, this also led to internal colonisation.

The Iranian Gendarmerie was founded in 1911 with the assistance of Sweden. The involvement of a neutral country was seen to avoid "Great Game" rivalry between Russia and Britain, as well as avoid siding with any particular alliance (in the prelude to World War I). Persian administrators thought the reforms could strengthen the country against foreign influences. The Swedish-influenced police had some success in building up Persian police in centralizing the country. After 1915, Russia and Britain demanded the recall of the Swedish advisers. Some Swedish officers left, while others sided with the Germans and Ottomans in their intervention in Persia. The remainder of the Gendarmerie was named amniya after a patrol unit that existed in the early Qajar dynasty. 

The number of Russian officers in the Cossack Brigade would increase over time. Britain also sent sepoys to reinforce the Brigade. After the start of the Russian Revolution, many tsarist supporters remained in Persia as members of the Cossack Brigade rather than fighting for or against the Soviet Union.

The British formed the South Persia Rifles in 1916, which was initially separate from the Persian army until 1921.

In 1921, the Russian-officered Persian Cossack Brigade was merged with the gendarmerie and other forces, and would become supported by the British.

At the end of the Qajar dynasty in 1925, Reza Shah's Pahlavi army would include members of the gendarmerie, Cossacks, and former members of the South Persia Rifles.

Art

See also
 Qajar dynasty
 Abdolhossein Teymourtash
 Austro-Hungarian military mission in Persia
 Bahmani family
 History of Iran
 Khanates of the Caucasus
 List of kings of Persia
 List of Shia dynasties
 Mirza Kouchek Khan
 History of the Caucasus

Notes

References

Sources
 
 
 
 
 
 
 
 
 
 
 
 
 
 
 
 
 
 
 Gvosdev, Nikolas K.: Imperial policies and perspectives towards Georgia: 1760–1819, Macmillan, Basingstoke 2000, 
 Lang, David M.: The last years of the Georgian Monarchy: 1658–1832, Columbia University Press, New York 1957

Further reading

External links

 The Qajar (Kadjar) Pages
 The International Qajar Studies Association
 Dar ol-Qajar
 Qajar Family Website
 Some Photos of Qajar Family Members
 Women's Worlds in Qajar Iran Digital Archive by Harvard University
 Qajar Documentation Fund Collection at the International Institute of Social History

States and territories established in 1785
States and territories disestablished in 1925
 
Empires and kingdoms of Iran
Monarchy in Persia and Iran
Modern history of Iran
Early Modern history of Armenia
Early Modern history of Azerbaijan
Early Modern history of Georgia (country)
History of Dagestan
1780s in Iran
1790s in Iran
1800s in Iran
19th century in Iran
20th century in Iran
1785 establishments in Iran
1925 disestablishments in Iran
Former countries of the interwar period
Former countries